Folly Mountain   is a mountain and a community in the Canadian province of Nova Scotia, located in Colchester County on Trunk 4 in the Cobequid Hills.

Previous to the opening of the Cobequid Pass, Trunk 4 was numbered for Highway 104 the Trans Canada Highway, passing over Folly Mountain and through Folly Lake to the Wentworth Valley. Due to high number of fatal accidents the Trans Canada Highway moved to the Cobequid Pass on Highway 104 when it was completed. Today the section of Trunk 4 is open to vehicles other than transport trucks that must use the Cobequid Pass.

References
Folly Mountain on Destination Nova Scotia
Tollroadsnews Nova Scotia Cobequid Pass Toll-104 opens
Geographical Names of Canada 

Mountains of Nova Scotia
Communities in Colchester County
General Service Areas in Nova Scotia
Mountains of Canada under 1000 metres